"Parted Ways" is a single from the album Arrow by Heartless Bastards. It is the first song by the band to chart.

Charts

References

2012 singles
Heartless Bastards songs
2012 songs
Partisan Records singles